The Volga German Autonomous Soviet Socialist Republic, abbreviated as the Volga German ASSR, was an autonomous republic of the Russian SFSR. Its capital city was Engels (known as Pokrovsk or Kosakenstadt before 1931) located on the Volga River. As a result of the German invasion of the Soviet Union in 1941, the Volga German ASSR was abolished and Volga Germans were exiled.

History
The republic was created following the October Revolution, by October 29 (some claim 19) 1918 Decree of the Soviet government, Volga German Workers' Commune, giving Soviet Germans a special status among the non-Russians in the USSR. It was upgraded to the status of Autonomous Soviet Socialist Republic on February 20, 1924 (claims of December 19, 1923), by the Declaration of the All-Russian Central Executive Committee and the Council of People's Commissars of the Russian SFSR. It became the first national autonomous unit in the Soviet Union after the Donetsk–Krivoy Rog Soviet Republic. It occupied the area of compact settlement of the large Volga German minority in Russia, which numbered almost 1.8 million by 1897. The republic was declared on January 6, 1924. 

At the moment of declaration of autonomy, an amnesty was announced. However, it eventually was applied to a small number of people. According to the policy of korenizatsiya, carried out in the 1920s in the Soviet Union, usage of the German language was promoted in official documents and Germans were encouraged to occupy management positions. According to the 1939 census, there were 366,685 Germans in the autonomy.

By January 1, 1941, the Volga Germans Autonomous Soviet Socialist Republic included the city of Engels and 22 cantons: Baltsersky, Gmelinsky, Gnadenflyursky, Dobrinsky, Zelmansky, Zolotovsky, Ilovatsky, Kamensky, Krasnoyarsky, Krasnokutsky, Kukkussky, Lizandergeysky, Marientalsky, Marxshtadtsky, Pallasovsky, Staro-Poltavsky, Ternovsky, Untervaldsky, Fedorovsky, Franksky, Ekgeimsky and Erlenbakhsky.

The German invasion of the Soviet Union in 1941 marked the end of the Volga German ASSR. On August 28, 1941, the republic was formally abolished and, out of fear they could act as German collaborators, all Volga Germans were exiled to the Kazakh SSR, Altai and Siberia. Many were interned in labor camps merely due to their heritage. On September 7, 1941, the republic was formally extinguished and its territory divided between the Saratov Oblast (15 cantons) and the Stalingrad Oblast (7 cantons).

Following the death of Stalin in 1953, the situation for Volga Germans improved dramatically. In 1964, a second decree was issued, openly admitting the government's guilt in pressing charges against innocent people and urging Soviet citizens to give the Volga Germans every assistance in their "economic and cultural expansion". With the existence of a socialist German state in East Germany now a reality of the post-war world, the Volga German Autonomous Soviet Socialist Republic was never reestablished.

Beginning in the early 1980s and accelerating after the fall of the Soviet Union, many Volga Germans have emigrated to Germany by taking advantage of the German law of return, a policy which grants citizenship to all those who can prove to be a refugee or expellee of German ethnic origin or as the spouse or descendant of such a person.

Population
The following table shows population of the ethnic groups of the Volga German ASSR:

Leaders

Heads of state

Central Executive Committee Chairmen (see Ispolkom)
 1918–1919: Ernst Reuter (1889–1953) (German statesman, diplomat, Mayor of Berlin)
 1919–1920: Adam Reichert (1869–1936) (teacher, journalist, kolkhoznik)
 1920: Alexander Dotz (1890–1965+) (World War I participant, Russian statesman)
 1920–1921: Vasiliy Pakun (Russian statesman)
 1921–1922: Alexander Moor (1889–1938) (World War I and Russian Civil War participant, Russian general, Russian statesman, Turkmenistani statesman, Uzbekistani statesman, shot in Tashkent)
 1922–1924: Wilhelm Kurz (1892–1938) (Russian statesman, shot)
 1924–1930: Johannes Schwab (1888–1938) (Russian statesman, shot)
 1930–1934: Andrew Gleim (1892–1954) (Russian statesman)
 1934–1935: Heinrich Fuchs (?–1938) (Russian statesman, shot)
 1935–1936: Adam Welsch (1893–1937) (World War I participant, chekist, regional party leader, Russian statesman, shot)
 1936–1937: Heinrich Lüft (1899–1937) (Russian statesman, shot)
 1937–1938: David Rosenberger (?–?) (Russian statesman)

Supreme Council Chairman
1938–1941: Konrad Hoffmann (1894–?) (World War I participant, railways worker, Russian statesman)

Heads of government
Sovnarkom of the Republic
Created on January 12, 1924, by the declaration at the first session of the Central Executive Committee of the Republic
 1924–1929: Wilhelm Kurz (1892–1938) (Russian statesman, shot)
 1929–1930: Andrew Gleim (1892–1954) (Russian statesman)
 1930–1935: Heinrich Fuchs (?–1938) (Russian statesman, shot)
 1935–1936: Adam Welsch (1893–1937) (World War I participant, chekist, regional party leader, Russian statesman, shot)
 1936–1937: Heinrich Lüft (1899–1937) (Russian statesman, shot)
 1937–1938: Wladimir Dalinger (1902–1965+) (Russian Civil War participant, security forces officer, Russian statesman, entrepreneur)
 1938–1941: Alexander Heckman (1908–1994) (engineer, Russian statesman, Gulag survivor)

See also
 History of Germans in Russia, Ukraine, and the Soviet Union
 Ethnic Germans
 Baltic Germans
 German Quarter
 Yellow Ukraine

References

External links

 Autonomous SSR of the Volga Germans
  Native Volga-German - researcher of his heritage
 German Villages in the Volga Valley of Russia
 High resolution map of VGASSR
 City of Pallasowka, Canton of the Volga-German ASSR
  Guide to the history of the Communist Party and the Soviet Union
 City of Marx, Canton of the Volga-German ASSR
  Документальный фильм о городе Маркс (documentary about the city of Marx).

Autonomous republics of the Russian Soviet Federative Socialist Republic
Early Soviet republics
German communities in Russia
Forced migration in the Soviet Union
1918 establishments in Russia
1941 disestablishments in the Soviet Union
Former socialist republics
Post–Russian Empire states